La Motte-Servolex is a commune in the Savoie department in the Auvergne-Rhône-Alpes region in south-eastern France. It is part of the urban area of Chambéry.

Geography

Climate

La Motte-Servolex has a humid continental climate (Köppen climate classification Cfb) closely bordering on a humid subtropical climate (Cfa).

Population

See also
Communes of the Savoie department

References

External links

Official site

Communes of Savoie